Leanne Crichton (born 6 August 1987) is a Scottish international footballer who plays as a midfielder for Motherwell and the Scotland national team. She has previously played for Notts County in the FA WSL as well as Hibernian, Celtic, Whitehill Welfare/Edinburgh Ladies and Glasgow City. She is also a coach, and a media pundit for BBC Scotland's football coverage on radio and television.

Playing career

Club
Crichton started her career with Cumbernauld Cosmos before moving to Whitehill Welfare. She had a short spell with Glasgow City in 2007 before moving on to Celtic later the same year, scoring a penalty on her debut against then reigning league champions Hibernian. Crichton went on to join Hibernian in 2011 for one season before returning for her second spell at Glasgow City in January 2012.

After winning a clean sweep of domestic honours with City in 2012, including a league campaign in which the club finished undefeated, Crichton made her bow in the UEFA Women's Champions League against ŽNK Osijek in the qualifying round of the 2012–13 competition. She went on to play in all five matches in City's run to the round of 32.

Crichton signed for FA WSL side Notts County in January 2015. In April 2017, she joined Glasgow City for a third spell with the club. She moved to Motherwell in 2021 to combine a playing and coaching role.

International
Crichton was part of Tony Gervaise's Scotland youth squad which qualified for the finals of the 2005 UEFA Women's Under-19 Championship in Hungary. While playing for the Edinburgh Ladies, she earned her first call up to the senior Scotland women's squad in August 2006 and made her debut in a challenge match against Belgium the following month.

National coach Anna Signeul recalled Crichton for Scotland's two challenge matches against the United States in February 2013. Crichton helped Scotland qualify for Euro 2017 and the 2019 World Cup, which was their first appearances in those major tournaments. She announcement her retirement from international football in January 2021, having made 72 international appearances in total.

International goals

Results list Scotland's goal tally first.

References

External links

Glasgow City player profile

1987 births
Living people
Scottish women's footballers
Scotland women's international footballers
Glasgow City F.C. players
Celtic F.C. Women players
Hibernian W.F.C. players
Notts County L.F.C. players
Footballers from Glasgow
Women's Super League players
Women's association football midfielders
Spartans W.F.C. players
2019 FIFA Women's World Cup players
Scottish Women's Premier League players
Motherwell L.F.C. players
Association football coaches
BBC sports presenters and reporters
UEFA Women's Euro 2017 players